SNP Media is a Dutch multimedia production company, which produces television programs, concerts and corporate films. The company was founded in 1979 by René Stokvis, who was general manager until Nov. 1, 2007. The company's original name was René Stokvis Producties, but is now known as SNP Media. He is still with the company, now as a consultant. SNP Media is an operating company of SNP Holdings, which is part of Endemol Group. The current board consists of SNP Holdings's Adrichem Peter as CEO) and Jasper Stokvis as Commercial Director.

SNP Media produces both public and commercial broadcasts including By land, sea and air, Una Voce Particolare, I'm leaving, Unexpected Visit, East Entrance, and That's The Question. The company also sponsored programs including the Tuinruimers and The Big Turn.

External links
SNP Holdings's website

Mass media companies of the Netherlands
Mass media in the Netherlands